Holland College is the provincial community college for the Canadian province of Prince Edward Island (PEI). It is named after the British Army engineer and surveyor Captain Samuel Holland.

History

It was formed by the Government of Prince Edward Island, then led by Premier Alex Campbell, in 1969 as a result of an education reform policy undertaken as part of the Prince Edward Island Comprehensive Development Plan, which saw the closure of the province's two post-secondary institutions structured along religious lines: St. Dunstan's University and Prince of Wales College. It also led to the creation of the nondenominational University of Prince Edward Island (UPEI) and Holland College.

Campuses

Charlottetown
 Prince of Wales Campus (main campus)
 Belmont Centre
 Tourism and Culinary Centre (Home of the Culinary Institute of Canada)

Alberton
West Prince Campus

Summerside
 Summerside Waterfront Campus
 Atlantic Police Academy, Slemon Park
 Marine Training Centre

Three Rivers
 Georgetown Centre
 Montague Centre

Programs
Holland College offers more than 60 one-year certificate and two-year diploma programs.

Scholarships
The college offers almost $500,000 in scholarships and bursaries for eligible students. In 2010, the college joined Project Hero, a scholarship program cofounded by General (Ret'd) Rick Hillier for the families of fallen Canadian Forces members.

See also
Higher education in Prince Edward Island

References

External links
 Official website

Colleges in Prince Edward Island
Education in Charlottetown
Education in Prince County, Prince Edward Island
Education in Kings County, Prince Edward Island
Cooking schools in North America
Hospitality schools